Roger Maynwaring, variously spelt Mainwaring or Manwaring, (29 June 1653) was a bishop in the Church of England, censured by Parliament in 1628 for sermons seen as undermining the law and constitution.

His precise motives for doing so remain unclear; unlike William Laud, he was not an Arminian, and many contemporaries believed he did so for preferment. He became Bishop of St Davids in 1636; in 1641, the Long Parliament issued a warrant for his arrest, and he fled to Ireland.

He returned to England in July 1642, shortly before the First English Civil War began, and, deprived of his See, retired to Brecon in Wales, where he died in June 1653.

Biography
Roger Maynwaring was born in Church Stretton, Shropshire; his father Thomas (1544–?) was the younger son of Sir Randall Maynwaring of Carincham, in Cheshire.

He apparently married twice; there are no details of his first wife, but his will mentions three adult daughters, a son, and his second wife Jane.

Career
Educated at King's School, Worcester, Maynwaring attended All Souls College, Oxford in 1604, graduating in 1611. He was installed as curate at St Katharine Cree in London, then rector of St Giles in the Fields in 1616.

The 1620s were a continuous period of conflict between the monarchy and Parliament; in June 1626, Charles I dissolved Parliament when it refused to fund the Spanish war, and imposed "forced loans". Those who refused to pay were held without trial; when Chief Justice, Sir Randolph Crewe ruled it illegal, he was dismissed, and over 70 individuals jailed.

Appointed a royal chaplain in 1625, Maynwaring delivered two sermons before Charles in July 1627, which expanded the principles of divine right beyond those stated by James VI and I. James himself acknowledged an obligation to consider the welfare of his subjects, but Maynwaring claimed those of a king were worth 'millions of subjects', whose only duty was to obey. Parliament's role was to comply with royal commands, whether raising taxes, or forced loans; refusal meant they risked damnation. 

Robert Sibthorpe, Isaac Bargrave and Matthew Wren also delivered sermons on the same lines, as part of a campaign co-ordinated by William Laud (then Bishop of Bath and Wells), which attempted to harness the Church of England to provide moral support for a fiscal policy. In addition, they were royal chaplains, preaching before Charles and the court, and thus prepared for a specific audience.

Where it became controversial was taking a general belief in divine right, and giving it specific application, in this case to taxes. Given the political context, this was inflammatory in itself, but Maynwaring adopted a position even more radical than that of his colleagues. It is difficult to overstate the fury among Calvinists like John Pym at his claim those who disobeyed the king risked eternal damnation. The suggestion 'kings were gods' was also regarded as blasphemy.

Even Laud advised against publishing the sermon, on the grounds there were many things therein which will be very distasteful to the people. When Charles insisted, Maynwaring's superior, George Montaigne, Bishop of London, took the precaution of putting 'At the Royal Command' on the front page. Charles wanted to have Sibthorpe's sermons printed, but George Abbot, the Archbishop of Canterbury, successfully resisted. 

In the 17th century, religion and politics were considered interdependent; 'good government' required 'true religion', and alterations in one, implied alterations in the other. Maynwaring was using theology to support policies most considered illegal, including Sir Edward Coke, a former Chief Justice, and most respected lawyer of the age. 

The 1628 Parliament that assembled in March established a religious committee, which included Pym, Francis Rous, and John Hampden. After they began a review of contentious preachers, Maynwaring further inflamed the situation by delivering the same message at St Giles on 4 June. Although many, including the John Williams, Bishop of Lincoln, felt ambition was the main driver, the Committee took time to refute his arguments. Impeached by Parliament for treason and blasphemy, he was imprisoned, fined, and suspended as a minister on 24 June.

However, on 6 July he was pardoned by Charles, who gave him another parish, Stanford Rivers; thereafter he gained a series of promotions, becoming Dean of Worcester in 1634, then bishop of St Davids in 1636. When Charles was forced to recall Parliament in 1640, his case was raised again by Robert Devereux, 3rd Earl of Essex. The Worcester city council objected to various 'Popish innovations' made during his time there, which were added to the original charges.

A warrant for his arrest was issued in August, but he had fled to Ireland; on his return in June 1642, he was recognised and taken before the magistrates in Minehead. After a brief period of imprisonment, he retired to Brecon, an area that remained solidly Royalist until the end of the First English Civil War in 1646. He was deprived of his See by Parliament on 9 October 1646, as episcopacy was abolished for the duration of the Commonwealth and the Protectorate. He seems to have been left in peace under the Commonwealth; he died in Brecon on 29 June 1653.

Notes

References

Sources
 
 
 
 
 
 
 
 
 
 
 
 
 

1590 births
1653 deaths
Bishops of St Davids
Alumni of All Souls College, Oxford
Deans of Worcester
17th-century Welsh Anglican bishops